Kathryn "Tubby" Johnston Massar ( Johnston) was the first woman to play in a Little League Baseball game in 1950.

Tubby's Rule
When the season had ended, a Little League meeting was held. It was decided that girls would be banned from Little League Baseball. It wasn't until Maria Pepe won a lawsuit in 1974 that girls were again allowed to play.

References

External links
 Official website

Living people
Little League
Female baseball players
Year of birth missing (living people)